Events from the year 1711 in Scotland.

Incumbents 

 Secretary of State for Scotland: The Duke of Queensberry, until 6 July; then The Earl of Mar

Law officers 
 Lord Advocate – Sir David Dalrymple, 1st Baronet; then Sir James Stewart
 Solicitor General for Scotland – Thomas Kennedy jointly with Sir James Steuart, Bt.

Judiciary 
 Lord President of the Court of Session – Lord North Berwick
 Lord Justice General – Lord Ilay (appointed this year to the Privy Council of the United Kingdom)
 Lord Justice Clerk – Lord Grange

Events 
 5 April (Easter Sunday) – Elgin Cathedral's central tower collapses.
 7 November – Dutch East Indiaman Liefde runs aground and sinks off Out Skerries, Shetland with the loss of all but one of her 300 crew.
 Church Patronage (Scotland) Act 1711 (becoming law 1 May 1712) restores the right of patrons to present ministers to Church of Scotland churches.
 Scottish Episcopalians Act 1711 (becoming law 3 March 1712) tolerates the right of the Scottish Episcopal Church to continue its Anglican form of liturgy and communion.
 Scotts Shipbuilding and Engineering Company founded at Greenock.
 Weir constructed at Forestmill on the Black Devon by George Sorocold to feed Gartmorn Dam reservoir.
 Export duty on linen.

Births 
 26 April – David Hume, philosopher and economist (died 1776)
 12 October – William Tytler, historian (died 1792)
Date unknown
 Alan Breck Stewart, Jacobite (died c. 1791 in exile)

Deaths 
 6 July – James Douglas, 2nd Duke of Queensberry, politician (born 1662; died in London)
Date unknown
 Sir James Foulis, 3rd Baronet, judge (born c. 1645)
 Adam Brown of Blackford, Lord Provost of Edinburgh died in office

The arts
 Publication of Choice Collection of Comic and Serious Scots Poems edited by James Watson concludes in Edinburgh.

See also 

 Timeline of Scottish history

References 

 
Years of the 18th century in Scotland
Scotland
1710s in Scotland